John Mark Taylor (19 August 1941 – 28 May 2017) was a British solicitor and Conservative politician who served as Member of Parliament (MP) for Solihull from 1983 to 2005, when he lost his seat to Lorely Burt of the Liberal Democrats by a margin of 279 votes in the 2005 general election. He had previously been a Member of the European Parliament (MEP) and leader of West Midlands County Council.  He was first elected to the House of Commons in 1983, and served as a junior minister under John Major.

Early life
He went to the independent Bromsgrove School and the College of Law. He was a senior partner in John Taylor & Co. solicitors.

He began his career in the Solihull County Borough Council in 1971, then went on to the West Midlands Metropolitan County Council in 1973.  He became Leader of the Opposition in 1975, Leader of the Council in 1977 and deputy chairman of the Association of Metropolitan Authorities in 1978.

Parliamentary career 
He contested Dudley East in February and October 1974.

Taylor was elected to the European Parliament for Midlands East in 1979, and served as the Conservatives' European Spokesman on the Community Budget from 1979 to 1981.  He was deputy chairman of the Conservative Group in the European Parliament from 1981 to 1982.

Elected as MP for Solihull in 1983, he held the seat for the subsequent four general elections. He became secretary of the Conservative Back Bench Committee on European Affairs in 1983, member of the Select Committee on the Environment from 1983 to 1987, as well as vice chairman of the Conservative Back Bench Committee on Sport.

He served as an assistant government whip from 1988 to 1989, a Lord Commissioner of Her Majesty's Treasury from 1989 to 1990 and Vice-Chamberlain of Her Majesty's Household from 1990 to 1992.

From 1992 to 1995, Taylor was Parliamentary Secretary at the Lord Chancellor's Department, a Parliamentary Under-Secretary of State at the Department of Trade and Industry from 1995 to 1997, and then a delegate Member of the Council of Europe and vice-chairman of the Conservative Parliamentary Committees on Trade and Industry and Legal Affairs.   He served in the Conservative Whips Office from 1997 to 1999, and became a Shadow Minister for Northern Ireland in 1999.

He narrowly lost his Solihull seat to the Liberal Democrat Lorely Burt in a surprise result in the May 2005 general election.

Death 
Taylor died in Solihull on 28 May 2017 at the age of 75.

References

External links
 
 They Work For You
 Ask Aristotle
 

1941 births
2017 deaths
Conservative Party (UK) MPs for English constituencies
Councillors in the West Midlands (county)
UK MPs 1983–1987
UK MPs 1987–1992
UK MPs 1992–1997
UK MPs 1997–2001
UK MPs 2001–2005
People educated at Bromsgrove School
People from Solihull
Conservative Party (UK) MEPs
MEPs for England 1979–1984